The Cabinet of Shehu Shagari formed the government of Nigeria during the presidency of Shehu Shagari between 1979 and 1983, after the return to civilian rule with the Second Nigerian Republic. Among the cabinet Ministers are Adamu Ciroma,  Bello Maitama Yusuf, Mamman Ali Makele etc. It was terminated by a military coup.

History
Lieutenant General Olusegun Obasanjo became head of the government after an attempted coup in February 1976. He managed the transition to civilian rule in an election won by the National Party of Nigeria led by Shehu Shagari.
Shagari took office on 1 October 1979.  He then appointed 61 ministers, of whom 24 were of cabinet rank. The ministers were both Muslim and Christian, with the Muslims assuming a larger and growing share of ministries, with most of the more important posts. Shagari made extensive use of the Cabinet Office, an organisation of leading professional civil servants, where it would have been more typical of a presidential system to rely more on political appointees.

Shagari did not have complete control over the immensely powerful ministers in his cabinet.  While he worked honestly, he was not powerful enough to discharge the many dishonest men working alongside him.

Shehu Shagari's National Party of Nigeria (NPN) won the 1983 general elections.  These were known as the worst elections in Nigeria's history. The political parties resorted to violence, arson, vote rigging and other malpractices in the struggle for victory.
After the second election, Shagari removed all but seven of the former members of his cabinet, and appointed various respected technocrats such as Emeka Anyaoku. 
He also reappointed his relative, Umaru Dikko, who had been accused of corruption.

Soon after Shagari began his second term as president on 31 December 1983, the military staged a coup. It was led by Major Generals Muhammadu Buhari and Tunde Idiagbon. The coup was launched two days after Shagari had announced an austerity program, forced due to a fall in the price of oil, which provided 90% of government revenue. Shagari and many cabinet members were arrested.
Buhari said the coup was required to remove the "inept and corrupt administration that left Nigeria a beggar nation."

Ministers

Cabinet members included:

Notes

Sources

Shehu Shagari